Objectivity can refer to:

 Objectivity (philosophy), the property of being independent from perception
 Objectivity (science), the goal of eliminating personal biases in the practice of science
 Journalistic objectivity, encompassing fairness, disinterestedness, factuality, and nonpartisanship
 Objectivity, a YouTube channel by Brady Haran
 Principle of material objectivity, a principle in continuum mechanics
 Objectivity/DB, an object-oriented database management system produced by Objectivity Inc.

See also
 Neutrality (philosophy)
 New Objectivity, German art movement
 Objective (disambiguation)
 Objectivism (disambiguation)